The 1896 United States presidential election in Pennsylvania took place on November 3, 1896 as part of the 1896 United States presidential election. Voters chose 32 representatives, or electors to the Electoral College, who voted for president and vice president.

Pennsylvania overwhelmingly voted for the Republican nominee, former Governor of Ohio William McKinley, over the Democratic nominee, former U.S. Representative from Nebraska William Jennings Bryan. McKinley won Pennsylvania by a landslide margin of 24.71%.

Results

Results by county

See also
 List of United States presidential elections in Pennsylvania

References

Pennsylvania
1896
1896 Pennsylvania elections